The initials PSAV may be used for
Argentine Socialist Vanguard Party, a former political party in Argentina
Prostate-specific antigen velocity, rate of change of PSA
Polo Sant'Anna Valdera, a research centre in Pisa, Italy